The 1922 Southern Branch Cubs football team represented the Southern Branch of the University of California (later known as UCLA) in the 1922 college football season. The program, which was later known as the Bruins, was in its fourth year of existence. The Cubs were coached by Harry Trotter and finished the season with a 2–3–1 record.

Schedule

References

Southern Branch
UCLA Bruins football seasons
Southern Branch Cubs football